Břetislav Krátký (12 September 1911 – 8 October 1987) was a Czech sprinter. He competed in the men's 4 × 400 metres relay at the 1936 Summer Olympics.

References

1911 births
1987 deaths
Athletes (track and field) at the 1936 Summer Olympics
Czech male sprinters
Czech male high jumpers
Olympic athletes of Czechoslovakia
Place of birth missing